Aldous is both a surname and a given name. Notable people with the name include:

Surname
David Aldous (actor)
David Aldous, mathematician
David Aldous, stock car driver; see List of 2008 motorsport champions
J. E. P. Aldous, Canadian composer
Lucette Aldous, Australian ballerina
Montague Aldous, surveyor of the Northwest Territories
Peter Aldous (born 1961), British politician
Robert Aldous, actor
William Aldous, judge and arbitrator

Given name
Aldous Harding, singer-songwriter from New Zealand
Aldous Huxley, writer

Masculine given names